The Wildhearts is the sixth album by the eponymous band. The first (download only) single was "The Sweetest Song" released two weeks before the album. The next single was "The New Flesh", the first on the album to be accompanied with a video.

Reception
The album reached number 55 in the UK album charts the week after its release.

Track listing 
 "Rooting for the Bad Guy"
 "The Sweetest Song"
 "The Revolution will Be Televised"
 "The New Flesh"
 "Slaughtered Authors"
 "The Hard Way"
 "Inner City Overture"
 "Bi-Polar Baby"
 "She's All That"
 "Destroy All Monsters"
 Named after the 1968 Godzilla movie. Ginger is well known for his love of B-movies.
 "So The Spencers Can Poke Out" (Japanese bonus track)
 "Oh Bonita" (Japanese bonus track)

Release information
UK Chart: No. 55
Formats: CD (Round010-2), Digital download

Personnel
 Ginger - vocals, guitar
 C. J. - guitar, vocals
 Ritch Battersby - drums
 Scott Sorry - bass, vocals

The Wildhearts albums
2007 albums